Salami Rural District is a rural district (dehestan) in Khanafereh District, Shadegan County, Khuzestan Province, Iran. At the 2006 census, its population was 15,245, in 2,552 families.  The rural district has 9 villages. The rural district was established in 2009.

References 

Rural Districts of Khuzestan Province
Shadegan County
2009 establishments in Iran